Church of the Highlands is a non-denominational, Christian multi-site megachurch headquartered in Birmingham, Alabama. It was the largest congregation in Alabama and the second largest church in the United States as of 2018 , with an average of 43,030 attendees every week. The senior pastor is Chris Hodges.

History 
The church was founded on February 4, 2001 by Chris Hodges and a core group of 34 people.  In 2007, it opened its main building, with a 2,400-seat auditorium.  The church has opened numerous campuses in the  Birmingham area.  According to a 2018 church census, it claimed a weekly attendance of 43,030 people and 17 campuses in different cities.  In the "Outreach 100" listing for 2022, Church of the Highlands was ranked second with attendance of more than 60,000 each week; it was ranked first in the previous listing in 2018. As of February 5, 2022, Church of the Highlands listed 25 individual campuses in Alabama and Georgia.

Affiliations
Church of the Highlands is affiliated with the Association of Related Churches (ARC). Its pastoral staff are among the founding members of ARC.

Highlands College was founded by Church of the Highlands staff.
Students of the college serve on various teams at the church. Highlands College states that they offer, "a unique approach to higher education through a holistic training experience," and focus on 4 areas of instruction: academic instruction, ministry training, character formation, and spiritual development.  Students who attend Highlands College have the option to receive a degree through the college's affiliation with Southeastern University (SEU).

See also
List of the largest evangelical churches
List of the largest evangelical church auditoriums
Worship service (evangelicalism)

References

External links
Official Website
Association of Related Churches

Churches in Birmingham, Alabama
Evangelical churches in Alabama
Evangelical megachurches in the United States
Christian organizations established in 2001
2001 establishments in Alabama
Megachurches in Alabama